The Great Plains College Association was a short-lived intercollegiate athletic football conference that existed from 1963 to 1964. The league had members in Nebraska.

Champions

1963 – Nebraska Wesleyan
1964 – Nebraska Wesleyan

See also
List of defunct college football conferences

References

Defunct college sports conferences in the United States
College sports in Nebraska